Bagʻdod District (also Bogʻdod tumani) is a district of Fergana Region in Uzbekistan. The capital lies at the town Bagʻdod. The district consists of 21 urban-type settlements (Bagʻdod, Amirobod, Maylavoy, Oltin vodiy, Bogʻishamol, Bordon, Doʻrmoncha, Irgali, Qaroqchitol, Kaxat, Qirqboldi, Konizar, Qoʻshtegirmon, Matqulobod, Mirzaobod, Samandarak, Samarqand, Oʻltarma, Xusnobod, Chekmirzaobod, Churindi) and 10 rural communities.

It was created on September 29, 1926, annexed to Uchkoʻprik District on December 24, 1962, and re-established on December 31, 1964.

References

Districts of Uzbekistan
Fergana Region